The 1930 German football championship, the 23rd edition of the competition, was won by Hertha BSC, defeating Holstein Kiel 5–4 in the final.

For Hertha it was the fifth consecutive final the club played in and the first championship the club won, having lost all four previous finals. Hertha would go on to win the 1931 final as well and thereby become only the second club, after 1. FC Nürnberg, to defend its title. For Holstein Kiel it was the third and last appearance in the final, having lost the 1910 one and won two years later in 1912, both against Karlsruher FV.

The final itself equaled the then-record of goals scored, nine, set in 1903. Hertha fell behind twice in the game, 0–2 and 2–3, before Hans Ruch scored the winning ninth goal of the game in the 87th minute.

1. FC Nürnberg's Josef Schmitt was the top scorer of the 1930 championship with seven goals.

Sixteen club qualified for the knock-out competition, two from each of the regional federations plus an additional third club from the South and West. In all cases the regional champions qualified and almost all of the runners-up, except in Central Germany where the second spot went to the regional cup winner. In the West the third spot went to the third placed team of the championship while, in the South, the third spot was determined in a separate qualifying competition for runners-up and third placed teams.

Qualified teams
The teams qualified through the regional championships:

Competition

Round of 16
The round of 16, played on 18 May 1930:

|}

Quarter-finals
The quarter-finals, played on 1 June 1930, with the replay held on 9 June:

|}

Replay

|}

Semi-finals
The semi-finals, played on 15 June 1930:

|}

Final
The final, played on 22 June 1930:

|}

References

Sources
 kicker Allmanach 1990, by kicker, page 164 & 177 - German championship

External links
 German Championship 1929–30 at weltfussball.de 
 German Championship 1930 at RSSSF

1
German
German football championship seasons